Hohe Wand is a municipality in the district of Wiener Neustadt-Land in the Austrian state of Lower Austria.
In this municipality there are four villages: Stollhof, Maiersdorf, Gaaden, and Netting.

Population

References

Cities and towns in Wiener Neustadt-Land District